The Treasury of New South Wales, branded NSW Treasury, a department of the New South Wales Government, is responsible for state financial management policy and reporting, and providing advice to the government on economic conditions and issues in New South Wales, Australia. NSW Treasury was established in April 1824 and is the oldest continuing government agency in Australia.

Core responsibilities 
 Management of NSW finances

 consistent collection and consolidation of financial information from public entities
 strong financial management through accurate data and advice
 effective delivery of the Budget and other financial reports, on behalf of the Treasurer.

Analysis, advice and delivery

 informed fiscal, economic, commercial and financial policy advice
 innovative reforms which support a strong and competitive economy
 providing fair and productive industrial relations and public sector wages policies
 robust risk management and governance frameworks.

Management of NSW assets

 value-creating commercial and financial transactions
 respected commercial, financial and service delivery reforms
 market-leading analysis and advice on private financing of public infrastructure
 managing, monitoring and advising on the efficiency and effectiveness of public sector commercial agencies.
Efficient management of NSW's cash resources is a key responsibility of Treasury.  A policy & guidelines paper published by Treasury in 2010 ('TPP10-2 Treasury Banking System Cash Forecasting and Banking Arrangements') provided the state's agencies with relevant information in relation to cash forecasting requirements and banking arrangements. In 2015, the Expenditure Review Committee of the state's Cabinet directed that public sector agencies (excluding state-owned corporations and authorities specifically approved by the NSW Treasurer) would, from 1 April 2015, operate as part of the Treasury Banking System. This decision applied to all agency cash deposits held ‘at call’.

Structure
The Treasury is led by its Secretary, Paul Grimes  who reports to the ministers listed below.

Ministers
The following ministers are responsible for administering The Treasury cluster:
 Treasurer of New South Wales, currently The Honourable  Matt Kean 
 Minister for Finance, currently The Hon. Damien Tudehope 

Ultimately, the Treasurer and Minister for Finance are responsible to the Parliament of New South Wales.

Current structural groups

The Treasury is divided into nine service groups that perform various functions on behalf of the department: 
Economic Strategy and Productivity Group
Trade, Tourism, Investment and Precincts Group
Policy and Budget Group
Commercial, Commissioning and Procurement Group
Financial and Operations Group
Human Resources
Information Technology
Office of the Secretary
Office of the General Counsel

Departmental Head

References

External links
NSW Treasury

Government departments of New South Wales
1824 establishments in Australia
State government finances in Australia
Economy of New South Wales